Maya Shemichishina (born 6 May 1972) is a Ukrainian hurdler. She competed in the women's 100 metres hurdles at the 2000 Summer Olympics.

References

1972 births
Living people
Athletes (track and field) at the 2000 Summer Olympics
Ukrainian female hurdlers
Olympic athletes of Ukraine
Place of birth missing (living people)